Fox Footy (stylised as FOX FOOTY) is an Australian rules football subscription television channel dedicated to screening Australian rules football matches and related programming.  It is owned by Fox Sports Pty Limited, operated out of their Melbourne based studios and available throughout Australia on Foxtel, and Optus Television. The channel is a revival of the former Fox Footy Channel, which was in operation between 2002 and 2006. The channel recommenced prior to the 2012 AFL season after a new broadcast agreement was reached between the former Premier Media Group, Austar, Foxtel and the Australian Football League (AFL).

As of June 2022, the channel reaches 1.174 million viewers weekly, making it the highest rated subscription channel on Foxtel.

History

Foxtel had previously operated the original Fox Footy Channel from 2002 to 2006, but closed the channel when Foxtel's AFL broadcast deal ended at the end of the 2006 season after failing to agreeing at the time a new agreement with free-to-air broadcasters Seven and Ten. On 8 February 2007, Foxtel had come to a agreement to broadcast 4 games a week from 2007 to 2011, up from 3 during 2002–2006 on Fox Sports channels, although it didn't include an AFL channel.

It was announced on 28 April 2011 that the channel would be revived for the 2012 AFL season, as part of the new broadcast rights deal that gave Foxtel rights to show all regular-season AFL matches live. The channel returned exclusively on Foxtel and its broadcasting partners, under the proposed new name of "Fox Sports AFL", which was later changed back to its original name "Fox Footy". The channel relaunched at 5:00 pm AEDT on Friday 17 February 2012 with the first NAB Cup round-robin match between Hawthorn, Richmond and North Melbourne.

Fox Footy has live broadcast rights to all Marsh Community Series matches, all AFLW home and away matches, all AFLW Finals matches including the Grand Final, all AFL home and away matches and all AFL Finals matches until the AFL Grand Final which is shown on delayed with the game being screened exclusively live on Seven. All matches are broadcast live to air in Standard, High Definition and selected matches in 4K Ultra HD with no commercial breaks during play. When two live matches are being played simultaneously, Fox Sports 503 broadcasts one of the matches.

From the start of the 2012 AFL season, Fox Footy had become the most watched Pay-TV network in Australia. In 2017, the AFL preliminary finals had 556,000 and 441,000 viewers. Beginning in 2020, Fox Footy and more Fox Sports Australia channels began carried in Canada on the premium streaming service DAZN.

The 2022 season saw some changes to the channel, with the network cutting ties with Eddie McGuire and the subsequent launch of two new programs, 'Best on Ground' and 'Face to Face' in addition to a time slot change for On the Couch. The network was rocked by further public interest during Round 1 after the termination of senior reporter Tom Morris after derogatory comments made against a colleague in a private chat were leaked publicly.

Programming

Current Programs
AFL Tonight (2016–present on Fox Sports News and Fox Footy)
AFL 360 (2010–2011 on Fox Sports, 2012–present on Fox Footy)
On the Couch (2002–2006 on Fox Footy Channel, 2007–2011 on Fox Sports, 2012–Present on Fox Footy)
Best On Ground (2022–present)
Bounce (2007–2011 on Fox Sports, 2012–present on Fox Footy)
First Crack (2019–present)
Trading Day (2018–present, post season)

Former Programs
AFL Insider (2010–2011 on Fox Sports, 2012 on Fox Footy)
The Club
Ed & Derm's Big Week In Footy
Eddie McGuire Tonight (2012)
The Hangar
The Recruit (2014–2016, also shown on Fox8)
The Supercoach Show
The Winners Rebooted (2015–2016 on Fox Footy)
League Teams (2002–2006 on Fox Footy Channel, 2007–2011 on Fox Sports, 2012–2017 on Fox Footy)
The Greatest (2017)
Up The Guts (2019)
On the Mark (2018–2019)
The Beep Test (2018–2019)
The Weekend Lowdown (2018)
Open Mike (2009–2011 on Fox Sports, 2012–2020 on Fox Footy)
Bob (2018–2019)
Saturday Stretch (2017–2021)
 Speed Round (2020)
Dermie Delivers (2021)
Face to Face (2022)

Events

Games
All AFL premiership matches are broadcast live, with no ads during game-play, excluding the AFL Grand Final, which is showed in delayed due to the Seven Network owning the exclusive broadcast rights. Most AFL Community Series matches are broadcast live.
AFL Community Series
AFL Premiership Season
AFL Finals Series (excluding AFL Grand Final)
AFL Under 18 Championships
AFLW premiership season
AFLW Finals Series(including AFLW Grand Final)

Special events
AFL Grand Final parade
Australian Football Hall of Fame night
AFL Players Association MVP awards
All-Australian awards
AFL Rising Star awards
Brownlow Medal
National AFL Draft
North Melbourne Grand Final Breakfast

Personnel

Coverage of certain matches including Friday nights, public holidays and finals is picked up from the Seven Network. Fox Footy uses Seven's video feed for the actual match, including graphics and commentary, but all surrounding footage, including pre-match, post-match, and between quarters, is replaced with Fox Footy's own coverage of the match. As of 2025, Fox will have access to clean feeds of Seven's footage for such matches, allowing Fox Footy to use their own commentary, graphics, and breakaways in all matches.

Commentators
Play-by-Play Callers
Dwayne Russell (2007–present)
Anthony Hudson (2012–present)
Adam Papalia (2016–present)
Brenton Speed (2017–present)
Kelli Underwood (AFL 2020 - Present, AFLW 2017–present)
Leigh Montagna (2018–present)
Mark Howard (2020–present)
Ben Waterworth (AFLW/U18’s, 2020–present)
Jack Heverin (AFLW, 2022–present)
Jess Webster (AFLW, 2022–present)

Special comments
Jason Dunstall (2002–present)
Gerard Healy (2004–present)
Alastair Lynch (2005–present)
Mark Ricciuto (2010–present)
David King (2010–present)
Brad Johnson (2011–present)
Dermott Brereton (2012–present)
Ben Dixon (2012–present)
Cameron Mooney (2013–present)
Jonathan Brown (2015–present)
Matthew Pavlich (2017–present)
Nick Dal Santo (2017–present)
Garry Lyon (2018–present)
Leigh Montagna (2018–present)
Jordan Lewis (2020–present)
Eddie Betts (2021–present)
Tony Armstrong (2021–present)
Nathan Buckley (2022–present)
Will Schofield (2022–present)

Studio & Match day hosts
Sarah Jones (2016–present)
Garry Lyon (2018–present)
Kelli Underwood (2018–present)
Jason Dunstall (fill-in host, 2018–present)
Kath Loughnan (2020–present)

Reporters
Jon Ralph (2012–present)
Drew Jones (2018–present)
Cath Durkin (2021–present)
David Zita (2022–present)

Hosts & contributors
AFL 360
Gerard Whateley (host) (2010–present)
Mark Robinson (host) (2010–present)
Jack Riewoldt (Tuesday panellist)
Adam Treloar (Tuesday panellist) 
Lachie Neale (Tuesday panellist) 
Christian Petracca (Tuesday panellist)
Tom Hawkins (Tuesday panellist)
Leigh Montagna (Wednesday panellist)
David King (Wednesday panellist)
Jordan Lewis (Wednesday panellist)
Eddie Betts (Wednesday panellist)
Kath Loughnan (fill-in host, 2021 - Present)

On the Couch
Garry Lyon (panellist 2018 - 2021, Host, 2022 - Present)
Jonathan Brown (panellist, 2015 - Present)
Nathan Buckley (panellist, 2023 - Present)
Jon Ralph (Reporter, 2022 - Present)

Best On Ground
Mark Howard (Host) 
Nathan Buckley (panellist)
Jonathan Brown (panellist)
Kath Loughnan (panellist)

Bounce
Jason Dunstall (host, 2007 - Present)
Andrew Gaze (panellist, 2020 - Present)
Cameron Mooney (panellist, 2016 - Present)
Bernie Vince (panellist, 2018 - Present)
 Ben Dixon (panellist, 2021 - Present)

First Crack
 Anthony Hudson (Host, 2022 - Present)
 David King (panellist)
 Leigh Montagna (panellist)
 Ben Dixon (Host/panellist)

AFL Tonight
Kath Loughnan (Monday host)
Drew Jones (Tuesday host/reporter)
Cath Durkin (Wednesday host/reporter)
Isabella Leembrugen (Thursday/Friday host)
Jon Ralph (reporter)
David Zita (reporter)

Former
The following are former commentators and panel show members

Kevin Bartlett (2002–2006)
Jason Bennett (2002–2006)
Matthew Campbell (2002–2006, 2008–2015)
Wayne Carey (2005–2006)
John Casey (2007–2008)
Tiffany Cherry (2002–2006)
Leigh Colbert (2007–2013)
Danny Frawley (2007–2019)
Clinton Grybas (2002–2007)
Barry Hall (2012–2016)
James Hird (2008–2010)
Glen Jakovich (2007–2012)
Brian Lake (2016–2018)
Neroli Meadows (2017–2019)
Liam Pickering (2007–2011)
Sandy Roberts (2014–2018)
Paul Roos (2011–2013, 2017–2019)
Tony Shaw (2002–2017)
Mike Sheahan (2002-2020)
Rohan Smith (2007–2011)
Brian Taylor (2009–2011)
 Sarah Olle (2017–2021)
Eddie McGuire (2012–2021)
Tom Morris (2015–2022)
Nick Riewoldt (2018–2022)

Logo history

See also

Fox Cricket
Fox League
Fox Netball
Fox Sports
List of sports television channels

References

External links

Fox Sports (Australian TV network)
Television channels and stations established in 2012
2012 establishments in Australia
English-language television stations in Australia
Sports television networks in Australia
Australian rules football mass media